Katharina Schüttler (born 20 October 1979) is a German television and film actress. Her film debut was in the movie Die Lok in 1992. She is best known internationally for leading roles as Clara Rosenbaum in The Promise (2011) and as Greta Müller in the television drama Generation War (2013).

Life and career
Schüttler grew up in Cologne. Her father is an actor, director and former theatre director and her mother is a playwright. After high school she studied acting at the Hanover University of Music, Drama and Media from 1999 to 2003.

In 2002, she played the title role in the German premiere of the play Lolita in a staging of Peter Kestmüller at the Schauspiel Hannover.

Katharina Schüttler preferably plays radical roles in which people are torn in existential situations.

In 2006, she was awarded by the critics survey of the magazine Theater Today 2006.

Selected filmography
 Die Lok (1992)
  (1997)
 Bombenstimmung (1997)
 Alles auf die 17 (1998)
 Der Trippler (2000)
 The State I Am In (2000)
 The White Sound (2002)
 Sophiiiie! (2002)
 Sehnsucht (2004)
 Wahrheit oder Pflicht (2005)
 Mädchen am Sonntag (2005)
  (2005)
  (2009)
 What a Man (2011)
 Generation War (2013, TV series)
 Run (2013, TV series)
 Free Fall (2013)
 Joy of Fatherhood (2014)
 Age of Cannibals (2014)
  (2014, TV film)
  (2014)
 13 Minutes (2015)
  (2015)
 Heidi (2015)
 Alone in Berlin (2016)
  (2016)
 The King's Choice (2016)
 The Little Drummer Girl (2018, TV series)
 Dogs of Berlin (2018, TV series)
 Die Hochzeit (2020)

References

External links

 
 Acting on Impulse. A portrait of actress Katharina Schüttler, German Films Quarterly 2/2015

Living people
1979 births
German film actresses
German television actresses
Actors from Cologne
Hochschule für Musik, Theater und Medien Hannover alumni
21st-century German actresses